The Lithuanian Green Party (LŽP) is a green-liberal political party in Lithuania. It was founded in 2011. Ieva Budraitė is their leader. Algirdas Butkevičius is its only member in parliament.

Leaders
 2011–2012: Juozas Dautartas (b. 1959)
 2012: Albinas Morkūnas (b. 1944)
 2012–2016: Linas Balsys  (b. 1961)
 2016–2020: Remigijus Lapinskas (b. 1968)
 2020–(2022): Ieva Budraitė (b. 1992)

See also
Green party
Green politics
List of environmental organizations
Politics of Lithuania

References

External links
Official website 

European Green Party
Centrist parties in Lithuania
Political parties established in 2011
Global Greens member parties
Green parties in Europe